Norval Campbell (21 September 1908 – 11 September 1977) was an Australian cricketer. He was educated at North Sydney Boys High School. He played eleven first-class matches for New South Wales between 1926/27 and 1934/35. In 1926, he took six wickets for 118 runs in an innings, and was the youngest leg spinner to achieve a five-wicket haul in the Sheffield Shield until Lloyd Pope took seven wickets for 87 runs in October 2018.

See also
 List of New South Wales representative cricketers

References

External links
 

1908 births
1977 deaths
Australian cricketers
New South Wales cricketers
Cricketers from Sydney
People educated at North Sydney Boys High School